"Feelin' On Yo Booty" is an R&B song by American singer-songwriter R. Kelly, from his fourth studio album, TP-2.com. Released on August 7, 2001, it is the fifth and final single from the album.

Music video
The music video is directed by Bille Woodruff. The video features DJ Khaled, Erick Sermon, Lil' Kim, Method Man & Redman, Nelly, Fat Joe, Tracy McGrady, Lennox Lewis and others.

Charts

Year-end charts

Legacy

Later samples
"Piss on You" by Dave Chappelle from the comedy series Chappelle's Show (2003)
"Crawl" by Childish Gambino from the album Because the Internet (2013)
"Dance Floor" by Nick Cannon from the album White People Party Music (2014)
”King of the Jungle” by Tyga from the album Kyoto (2018)

References

2001 singles
2000 songs
R. Kelly songs
Songs written by R. Kelly
Song recordings produced by R. Kelly
Jive Records singles
Contemporary R&B ballads
2000s ballads